Heinz Schimmelpfennig (6 April 1919 – 31 December 2010) was a German actor and director.

After leaving school, Schimmelpfennig trained as a designer until 1939. He then joined as a soldier in World War II, before being wounded in 1942 and leaving the forces.

After his recovery, he found a job as a camera assistant at the UFA in Babelsberg. He then realised that he wanted to become an actor himself, so in 1943, he studied two years of studying acting at the Max Reinhardt Seminar in Vienna.

External links

References

1919 births
2010 deaths
German male stage actors
German male television actors
German male film actors
German male radio actors
Male actors from Berlin
German military personnel of World War II